Róbert Vaniš (born 29 September 1992) is a Slovak football midfielder who currently plays for Austrian club SC Muckendorf.

References

External links
 
 Eurofotbal profile

1992 births
Living people
Slovak footballers
Association football midfielders
ŠK Slovan Bratislava players
FC ViOn Zlaté Moravce players
MFK Ružomberok players
Slovak Super Liga players
Expatriate footballers in Austria
Sportspeople from Malacky